The Big East Conference is a collegiate athletic conference that competes in NCAA Division I in ten men's sports and twelve women's sports. Headquartered in New York City, the eleven full-member schools are primarily located in Northeast and Midwest metropolitan areas. The conference was officially recognized as a Division I multi-sport conference on August 1, 2013, and since then conference members have won NCAA national championships in men's basketball, women's cross country, field hockey, men's lacrosse, and men's soccer. Val Ackerman is the commissioner.

The conference was formed after the "Catholic Seven" members of the original Big East Conference elected to split from the football-playing schools in order to start a new conference focused on basketball. These schools (DePaul, Georgetown, Marquette, Providence, Seton Hall, St. John's, and Villanova) had announced their decision in December 2012. In March 2013, the new conference purchased the Big East Conference name, logos, basketball records, and the rights to the men's basketball tournament at Madison Square Garden from the football-playing members of the old Big East, who formed the American Athletic Conference (AAC), which is the old conference's legal successor. Both conferences share 1979 as their founding date, when the original conference was founded by Dave Gavitt, and the same history through 2013.

Three more schools, Butler, Creighton, and Xavier, joined the conference on its July 1, 2013, launch date. In June 2019, the Big East invited the University of Connecticut (UConn) to "re-join" the conference from the AAC, which they did on July 1, 2020. Football is not a sponsored sport, and UConn is the only member with a varsity football team in the top-level Division I FBS. Butler, Georgetown, and Villanova do operate football programs in the second-level Division I FCS. The conference also has four associate members in field hockey, and one in men's and women's lacrosse.

History

The original Big East

The original Big East Conference was founded in 1979, when Providence College basketball coach Dave Gavitt spearheaded an effort to assemble an east coast basketball-centric collegiate athletic conference. The core of the Big East formed when Providence, St. John's, Georgetown, and Syracuse invited Seton Hall, Connecticut (UConn), Holy Cross, Rutgers, and Boston College (BC). Holy Cross turned down the invitation, as did Rutgers initially, while BC, Seton Hall, and UConn accepted. Gavitt became the Big East's first commissioner, and Villanova and Pittsburgh joined the conference shortly thereafter. PR firm Duffy & Shanley is credited with the initial branding and naming work for the conference. The "high point" of the original conference is widely considered to be the 1985 NCAA tournament, in which Georgetown, St. Johns, and Villanova all made the Final Four, and Villanova defeated Georgetown to win the national championship.

The conference remained largely unchanged until 1991, when it began to sponsor football, adding Miami as a full member, and Rutgers, Temple, Virginia Tech, and West Virginia as football-only members. Rutgers and West Virginia upgraded to full Big East membership in 1995, while Virginia Tech did the same in 2000. Notre Dame also joined as a non-football member effective in 1995.  Temple football was kicked out after the 2004 season due to what was deemed by the other football-playing members a failure to make a strong effort to field a competitive team, but rejoined in 2012 after seriously upgrading its football program and intended to become a full Big East member in 2013.

The unusual structure of the Big East, with the "football" and "non-football" schools, led to instability in the conference. The Big East was one of the most severely impacted conferences during conference realignment of 2005 and the early 2010s. In all, 14 member schools announced their departure for other conferences, and 15 other schools announced plans to join the conference (eight as all-sports members, and four for football only). Three of the latter group later backed out of their plans to join (one for all sports, and the other two for football only). These waves of defection and replacement revealed tension between the football-sponsoring and non-football schools that eventually led to the split of the conference in 2013.

Split and re-founding

On December 15, 2012, the Big East's seven non-FBS schools – DePaul, Georgetown, Marquette, Providence, St. John's, Seton Hall, and Villanova – announced that they had voted unanimously to separate from the Big East football-playing schools. The schools splitting away were referred to as the "Catholic 7" due to their common religious background, and were motivated in part by a desire to return to Gavitt's original vision of a strong, Northeast-based and basketball-focused conference, and by prospects of a better television deal than they would have received by remaining with the football schools. The move occurred during a limited window in which these non-FBS schools held a voting majority in the conference—after the defection of certain FBS schools to the ACC but before the effective inclusion of candidate FBS schools to replace them.

Negotiations with the other member schools continued in early 2013, and in March, it was reported that the "Catholic 7" schools would leave the conference on June 30, 2013, but that they would retain the Big East Conference name, logos, $10 million from the old conference's treasury, and the right to hold their men's basketball tournament at Madison Square Garden. At a March 20 news conference in New York City, Georgetown President John J. DeGioia, representing this new conference, announced that Butler University and Xavier University, both then members of the Atlantic 10 Conference, as well as Creighton University in the Missouri Valley Conference would also join the new league at its launch. Additional announcements confirmed their headquarters in New York City, and a 12-year, $500 million television contract with Fox Sports and its networks, and a 6-year television contract with CBS and its CBS Sports Network. On June 26, 2013, the new conference hired Val Ackerman, former WNBA president, as the conference's first commissioner.

Field hockey and lacrosse associate members
The remaining members of the old conference later announced they would continue as the American Athletic Conference (AAC). Several AAC and former Big East schools however continued playing lacrosse and field hockey with the new Big East Conference in 2013, including Rutgers and Louisville, before moving their programs to the Big Ten and Atlantic Coast Conferences respectively in 2014–15. AAC members UConn and Temple also both joined the new Big East for women's lacrosse and field hockey, while Cincinnati joined the women's lacrosse league, Denver joined the men's lacrosse league, and Old Dominion joined the field hockey league.

The launch of a women's lacrosse league in the Big Ten for the 2015 season caused the American Lacrosse Conference (ALC) to dissolve after the 2014 season; two Southeastern Conference teams that had been ALC members, Florida and Vanderbilt, joined the Big East as associate members in that sport. The next changes to Big East associate membership came during the 2015–16 school year. First, on December 8, 2015, the conference announced that Liberty and Quinnipiac would become associate members in field hockey effective with the 2016 season. Then, on May 3, 2016, the Big East announced that Denver, already an affiliate in men's lacrosse, would move its women's lacrosse team into the league in the 2016–17 school year (2017 season). In addition to the new associate members, full member Butler announced on October 21, 2015 that it would elevate its club team in women's lacrosse to full varsity status in the 2017 season and immediately begin Big East competition.

The American Athletic Conference began sponsoring women's lacrosse in the 2019 season (2018–19 school year), which led to the departure of all then-current Big East women's lacrosse associates except Denver. On that same date, the Big East announced that field hockey member Old Dominion would also become a Big East women's lacrosse member in the 2019 season, maintaining Big East women's lacrosse membership at 6 teams and preserving its automatic berth to the NCAA women's tournament.

Return of UConn

In June 2019, various news outlets reported that UConn would soon leave the AAC for the Big East, pending a decision on the future of the school's football program. Many news stories described UConn as "rejoining" the Big East, because UConn was a founding member of the original Big East, but remained with the football-playing members when the conference reorganized as the AAC in 2013. By 2018 however, UConn had seen a dramatic decline in athletic department revenues. Mutual interest between UConn and the new Big East had been reported by several sources starting in 2016.

On June 24, 2019, the Big East formally approved an invitation for UConn to join the conference. The UConn Board of Trustees accepted the invitation two days later, thus reuniting UConn with several of the schools against whom it competed for 34 years in the old Big East. UConn and the AAC reached a buyout agreement the following month, clearing the way for UConn to become a member of the Big East on July 1, 2020. At the time the buyout agreement was reported, UConn announced that its football team would become an FBS independent upon its arrival in the Big East. UConn's men's & women's hockey teams remain a member of the Hockey East Association. In 2020, Old Dominion's women's lacrosse left the Big East for the AAC, essentially swapping places with UConn, so both conferences maintained the six members required for an automatic bid.

Member schools

Full members
Nine of the eleven members of the Big East are private, Catholic institutions. The exceptions are Butler, which is nonsectarian (although it was founded by the Christian Church (Disciples of Christ)) and UConn, which is the only public institution.

Notes

Associate members
Future associates in green.

Notes

Former associate members
Because the American Athletic Conference did not sponsor lacrosse or field hockey immediately after the Big East split, several schools from The American joined the reconfigured Big East as associate members in those sports. UConn, Louisville, Rutgers, and Temple joined in both women's lacrosse and field hockey, with Rutgers also joining in men's lacrosse, while Cincinnati joined only in women's lacrosse. Among these schools, Louisville and Rutgers were associates only for one season, as both became full members of conferences that sponsored their remaining Big East sports in 2014—respectively the Atlantic Coast Conference and Big Ten Conference. The other named schools stayed in Big East women's lacrosse until The American began a women's lacrosse league in 2018–19.

Notes

Membership timeline

Men's sports

Basketball
The 2013–14 season marked the inaugural season of the reconfigured Big East. Kicking off with media day at Chelsea Piers, the season started with much fanfare and excitement around the country's elite basketball-centric conference.  Aided by the lucrative TV agreement with FS1, almost all Big East games were televised, helping to maintain and grow Big East basketball as a national brand. For 2014–15, the Big East had four schools ranked in the top 20 and six schools in the top 30 recruiting classes nationally according to ESPN, Scout and Rivals rankings. Villanova won the conference's first national championship since realignment in 2016. The conference holds the record for the highest percentage of members ever sent to one tournament from a single conference at 70%.

Big East Champions and tournament bids

All-time wins and NCAA appearances
This list goes through the 2019–20 season.

NCAA National Championships

Soccer
All full Big East member schools field men's soccer teams. Akron will become an associate member in 2023.

NCAA National Championships

Lacrosse
Big East men's lacrosse is made up of charter members Georgetown, Marquette, Providence, St. John's, and Villanova, as well as Denver.  NCAA regulations state that there must be six teams for a league to receive an automatic bid to the NCAA tournament, and since Butler, Creighton, DePaul, Seton Hall, and Xavier only field club teams, the Big East had to look elsewhere.  Both Denver and Johns Hopkins were rumored as targets for potential invitation and Denver was ultimately invited to join the Big East as a lacrosse-only member.  Denver joined the Big East as one of the hottest teams in the country; at the time of the relaunch of the Big East in July 2013, the Pioneers had made six NCAA Tournament appearances in the previous eight seasons and had appeared in two Final Fours in the previous three seasons. The University of Denver houses most of its other sports in The Summit League; most of that league's other teams are closer to that school's Denver campus than the bulk of the Big East.  There is still uncertainty to whether or not Butler, Creighton, DePaul, Seton Hall, UConn, or Xavier will elevate their programs from the club level, or if any other programs will receive lacrosse-only invitations.

NCAA National Championships

Baseball
Big East full member schools Butler, Creighton, Georgetown, Seton Hall, St. John's, UConn, Villanova and Xavier all field men's baseball teams. DePaul and Marquette have never fielded Big East baseball teams, while Providence fielded one until 1999 when it was dropped and later replaced with lacrosse.

Swimming and Diving
Big East men's swimming & diving is made up entirely of charter conference members, with UConn being a charter member of the 1979 incarnation, Xavier a charter member of the 2013 incarnation, and Georgetown, Providence, Seton Hall, and Villanova being charter members of both versions. However, UConn announced shortly before rejoining the Big East that it would cut men's swimming & diving along with men's cross country, men's tennis, and women's rowing effective in July 2021. Butler cut men's swimming & diving in 2007, when they also cut lacrosse. St. John's cut men's swimming & diving in 2003 due to Title IX, when they also cut women's swimming & diving, football, men's cross country, men's indoor track & field, and men's outdoor track & field and added men's lacrosse. The Big East Conference originally started sponsoring men's swimming & diving in 1979.

The Big East Conference Men's Swimming & Diving Championships have been held at some of the most prestigious pools in the United States. These pools include: Indiana University Natatorium, which has hosted multiple NCAA Division I Men's Swimming & Diving Championships and multiple United States Olympic Swimming Trials and United States Olympic Diving Trials; Nassau County Aquatic Center, which has hosted NCAA Division I Men's Swimming & Diving Championships and the International Goodwill Games; and University of Pittsburgh's Trees Pool, which hosted a total of 17 Big East Conference Men's Swimming & Diving Championships. Out of the current members, Xavier has won a total of six Big East Conference Men's Swimming & Diving Championships, while Georgetown, Seton Hall, and Villanova have each won two.

Cross Country
Villanova men's cross country team won three straight NCAA National Championships in 1966, 1967 and 1968, as well as a fourth in 1970.  They also finished 2nd in 1962 and 1969. Providence men's cross country team have also finished in second in 1981 and 1982.

NCAA National Championships

Women's sports

Basketball

Field Hockey
The Big East began sponsoring field hockey in 1989, but conference records only indicate that a postseason tournament was held; the first recorded season of full league play was 1993, with Boston College, UConn, Georgetown, Providence, Syracuse, and Villanova participating. Georgetown left Big East field hockey after the 1994 season, and was replaced by incoming Big East member Rutgers. The next change in field hockey membership came in 2005, when BC left for the ACC and was replaced by Louisville. Georgetown returned its field hockey program to the Big East the next year, after which the conference's field hockey membership remained unchanged until the 2013 conference split. Shortly before the split, Old Dominion was set to join the original Big East as a field hockey associate.

The conference split left both successor leagues—the reconfigured Big East and The American—with too few field hockey members to qualify for an automatic NCAA tournament berth. As a result, both leagues agreed that only the "new" Big East would sponsor the sport, and that all American members with field hockey programs would become associates. Accordingly, the Big East field hockey conference would now be made up of Big East full members Georgetown, Providence, and Villanova; American members UConn, Louisville, Rutgers, and Temple; and Old Dominion, otherwise a member of Conference USA. Following the 2014 departure of Louisville and Rutgers for all-sports membership in conferences that sponsored field hockey (respectively the ACC and Big Ten), Big East field hockey operated with six members until Liberty and Quinnipiac joined as associate members in 2016.

NCAA National Championships
The only honors listed here are those earned by Big East field hockey members while playing the sport in the conference. In addition to these:
 UConn had two national titles and two runner-up finishes as a member of the original Big East, but before the conference established a field hockey league.
 Old Dominion had nine national titles and three runner-up finishes before joining Big East field hockey.

Soccer

Softball
Nine Big East members sponsor softball, with Marquette and Xavier as the exceptions. The original Big East first sponsored the sport in the 1990 season.

Swimming and Diving
Big East women's swimming & diving is made up of charter members Butler, Georgetown, Providence, Seton Hall, UConn, Villanova and Xavier (UConn was a charter member of the original Big East, but not of its 2013 version). St. John's cut women's swimming & diving in 2003 due to Title IX, when they also cut men's swimming & diving, football, men's cross country, men's indoor track & field, and men's outdoor track & field and added men's lacrosse. The Big East Conference originally started sponsoring women's swimming & diving in 1981–82, the same season in which the NCAA began sponsoring women's sports.

The Big East Conference Women's Swimming & Diving Championships have been held at some of the most prestigious pools in the United States. These pools include: Indiana University Natatorium, which has hosted multiple NCAA Division I Women's Swimming & Diving Championships and multiple United States Olympic Swimming Trials and United States Olympic Diving Trials; Nassau County Aquatic Center, which has hosted NCAA Division I Women's Swimming & Diving Championships and the International Goodwill Games; and University of Pittsburgh's Trees Pool, which hosted a total of 17 Big East Conference Women's Swimming & Diving Championships. Out of the current members, Villanova has won a total of 15 Big East Conference Women's Swimming & Diving Championships.

Volleyball
All full members of the Big East sponsor women's volleyball. However, during the first season of the reconfigured Big East in 2013, Providence was an affiliate member of the America East Conference. The Friars joined Big East volleyball in 2014 after completing their contractual obligation to the America East.

Cross Country
The Providence women's cross country team have been crowned NCAA National Champions in 1995 and 2013, as well as finishing 2nd in 1990 and 2012. The Villanova women's cross country team won two straight NCAA National Championships in 2009 and 2010 and six straight NCAA National Championships in 1989, 1990, 1991, 1992, 1993, and 1994. Villanova runners also won an individual NCAA National Championship in 1998, as well as placing 3rd in 1995, 2nd in 1996 and 3rd in 2011.  The Georgetown women's cross country team were NCAA National Champions in 2011.

NCAA National Championships

Lacrosse
The Big East began sponsoring women's lacrosse in the 2001 season with Boston College, UConn, Georgetown, Notre Dame, Rutgers, Syracuse, and Virginia Tech. The original lineup stayed in place until Virginia Tech and BC left for the ACC, respectively in 2004 and 2005. The conference replaced BC with Loyola (Maryland) for the 2006 season, and the Greyhounds remained an associate member until the school joined the Patriot League, which already sponsored women's lacrosse, in 2013. Originally, the conference championship was decided solely by league play; a postseason tournament was added starting in the 2007 season with the top four teams qualifying, a format that exists to this day. The next changes in women's lacrosse membership came in the 2009 season, when Cincinnati and Louisville (both of which had only added varsity lacrosse for the 2008 season) brought their teams into the Big East. Villanova followed in the 2010 season.

As in the case of field hockey, the 2013 conference split left the Big East and The American with too few lacrosse teams for an automatic NCAA bid. Also in a parallel with field hockey, the two conferences agreed that only the reconfigured Big East would sponsor the sport, with all women's lacrosse teams from The American becoming associate members. The first season of women's lacrosse in the reconfigured league in 2014 would thus include Cincinnati, UConn, Georgetown, Louisville, new varsity team Marquette, Rutgers, Temple, and Villanova. The Big East would lose Louisville and Rutgers after that season, respectively to the ACC and Big Ten, replacing them with Florida and Vanderbilt (the only two SEC schools sponsoring the sport) after the demise of the American Lacrosse Conference.

For the 2017 season, Butler added varsity women's lacrosse and Denver brought its women's lacrosse team into the league, giving the Big East 10 members in the sport. However, after the 2018 season, the Big East lost all of its women's lacrosse associate members except Denver to the new women's lacrosse conference of The American. The Big East retained its automatic NCAA tournament bid for the 2019 season and beyond by adding Old Dominion, already an associate member in field hockey.

On April 16, 2020, Old Dominion announced its women's lacrosse would join the American Athletic Conference in the 2021 season (2020–21 school year), essentially swapping places with incoming full member UConn. Both conferences thus maintained the six members required for an automatic bid to the NCAA tournament.

Xavier has announced it will add women's lacrosse in the 2023 season, playing as an independent for its first season before starting full Big East play in 2024.

NCAA Team Championships

This list includes NCAA championships won by members of the Big East. Excluded from this list are all national championships earned outside the scope of NCAA competition, including ICSA sailing championships (14 by Georgetown), women's AIAW championships (2 by Old Dominion), equestrian titles (0), and retroactive Helms Athletic Foundation titles (1 by St. John's).

Facilities
Future members in gray.

Notes:

See also
 Big East Conference (1979–2013)
 American Athletic Conference
 List of NCAA conferences

References

External links

 

 
Sports in the Eastern United States
Sports in the Midwestern United States
Sports leagues established in 2013
Articles which contain graphical timelines